The Men's Individual normal hill/10 km at the FIS Nordic World Ski Championships 2011 was held on 26 February 2011. The ski jumping part of the event took place at 10:00 CET with the cross-country part took place at 13:00 CET. Todd Lodwick of the United States was the defending world champion while France's Jason Lamy Chappuis was the defending Olympic champion.

Results

Ski jumping

Cross-country skiing

References

FIS Nordic World Ski Championships 2011